Harmologa scoliastis is a species of moth of the family Tortricidae. It is endemic to New Zealand.

Taxonomy 
This species was first described by Edward Meyrick in 1907 and named Trachybathra scoliastis.

Description 
The wingspan is about 18 mm. The forewings are pale brownish, suffused with whitish. The costa and dorsum are strigulated (finely streaked) with dark fuscous. The hindwings are fuscous, strigulated with darker. There is some ochreous-yellowish suffusion in the centre of disc and towards the costa in the middle.

References

Moths described in 1907
Archipini